Carmelo Cabrera Domínguez (born 6 January 1950) is a Spanish retired professional basketball player. He competed in the men's tournament at the 1972 Summer Olympics.

References

External links
 

1950 births
Living people
Basketball players at the 1972 Summer Olympics
CB Canarias players
CB Valladolid players
Liga ACB players
Olympic basketball players of Spain
Real Madrid Baloncesto players
Spanish men's basketball players
1974 FIBA World Championship players
Sportspeople from Las Palmas